Adamawa United is a Nigerian football club from Yola, they play in the second tier of Nigeria football league system, the Nigeria National League.

They play at the Ribadu Square Stadium, with a capacity of 5,000. They were relegated from the Nigerian Professional Football League in 2007 after a one-year stint.
They were relegated from the league in 2012 but bought back the slot from promoted rivals Makwada F.C.

Current squad
As of 3 January 2021

References

External links
 Adamawa United laments lack of support from state govt.
 Cash Crunch Plunder Adamawa United
 Adamawa United players sacked
 Commissioner Warns Adamawa United FC Against Selling Matches
 NNL: Victory excites Adamawa United forward 

Football clubs in Nigeria
Adamawa State
Sports clubs in Nigeria